Kayempur High School is a school in Kayempur village, Khansama Upazila, Dinajpur, Bangladesh. It has about 600 students.

History 
Kayempur High School was established in 1968 by Md Jinat Ali.

Teachers
There about 14 teachers. Md Altaf Hossain is now headmaster of Kayempur High School.

Students
There are about 600 students enrolled.

References 

Educational institutions established in 1968
High schools in Bangladesh
Schools in Dinajpur District, Bangladesh
1968 establishments in East Pakistan